Permata Sapura Tower (or initially known as KLCC Lot 91, Malay: Menara Permata Sapura) is a skyscraper located at the Kuala Lumpur City Centre (KLCC) in Kuala Lumpur, Malaysia. The construction of the skyscraper was completed in 2020 and is currently among the tallest skyscrapers in Malaysia.

Construction of the skyscraper was initially proposed in 2011, when Sapura Resources, a Malaysian property developer, announced a joint-venture with KLCC Property Holdings to develop a plot of land  in area. The construction originally involves a complex of a 46-storey skyscraper, a convention centre and retail podiums on a plot of land known as Lot 91. 80 percent of the project was funded by Maybank, Public Bank Berhad and RHB Bank worth RM1.08 billion (US$258.2 million).

See also
 List of tallest buildings in Malaysia
 List of tallest buildings in Kuala Lumpur

References

External links
 

Office buildings completed in 2020
Skyscrapers in Kuala Lumpur
2020 establishments in Malaysia